Roberta Bianconi (born 8 July 1989) is an Italian water polo player. She was part of the Italian team that won the silver medal at the 2016 Olympics and the bronze medal at the 2015 World Championships.

Bianconi was named 2015 and 2016 LEN European Water Polo Player of the Year being the first female player to be awarded by LEN in multiple times.

Club career
 2007–2011  Rapallo
 2011–2012  Pro Recco
 2012–2013  RN Bogliasco
 2013–2014  Rapallo
 2014–2017  Olympiacos Piraeus
 2017–  Ekipe Orizzonte

Club honours

Rapallo
 1 LEN Trophy
 2011.
1 Coppa Italia
 2014.

Pro Recco
 1 LEN Euro League
 2012.
 1 LEN Super Cup
 2011.
1 Serie A1
 2012.

Olympiacos
 1 LEN Euro League
 2015.
 1 LEN Super Cup
 2015.
 3 Greek Championships
 2015, 2016 and 2017.

Ekipe Orizzonte
 1 LEN Trophy
 2019.
1 Serie A1
 2019.
1 Coppa Italia
 2018.

See also
 List of Olympic medalists in water polo (women)
 List of World Aquatics Championships medalists in water polo

References

External links
 
 

1989 births
Living people
People from Rapallo
Italian female water polo players
Water polo drivers
Water polo players at the 2012 Summer Olympics
Water polo players at the 2016 Summer Olympics
Medalists at the 2016 Summer Olympics
Olympic silver medalists for Italy in water polo
World Aquatics Championships medalists in water polo
Competitors at the 2018 Mediterranean Games
Mediterranean Games medalists in water polo
Mediterranean Games silver medalists for Italy
Olympiacos Women's Water Polo Team players
Italian expatriate sportspeople in Greece
Sportspeople from the Province of Genoa
20th-century Italian women
21st-century Italian women
Expatriate water polo players